Havildar Abdul Rahman  (1921–1946) was a soldier of the British Indian Army who was posthumously awarded the George Cross, the highest British (and Commonwealth) award for bravery not in combat. He was awarded the decoration for the gallantry he showed while saving three other men from a burning vehicle on 22 February 1946 in Kletek in Java. He was serving with the 3rd Battalion of the 9th Jat Regiment, which had fought in the Battle of Cauldron against Rommel's forces and saw action at Imphal. His GC award was announced in the London Gazette of 10 September 1946. His surname is sometimes spelled "Rehman".
Abdul Rehman also won the Military Medal in Burma in 1944.

References

See also
List of George Cross recipients

Indian recipients of the George Cross
Indian Army personnel of World War II
1921 births
1946 deaths
British Indian Army soldiers
Recipients of the Military Medal